Košarkaški klub Slodes is a men's basketball club based in Belgrade, Serbia. They currently competing in the Second Basketball League of Serbia.

History 
The club was found in 2009. They used to play in the 3rd-tier First Regional League of Serbia, Center Division. They finished at the top spot in the 2019–20 season prior the cancellation of the season. After the abandoned season, the club got promoted to the Second Basketball League of Serbia for the 2020–21 season.

Sponsorship naming
The club has had several denominations through the years due to its sponsorship:
Slodes SoccerBet: 2021–2022

Home arena
Slodes plays its home games at the Slodes Hall. The hall is located in the Stari košutnjak neighborhood, Rakovica in Belgrade and was built in 1995. It has a seating capacity of 2,000 seats.

Players

Head coaches 
  Tomislav Tomović
  Marko Boras (2018 – December 2021)
  Nenad Karanović, interim (December 2021)
  Igor Polenek (December 2021 – March 2022)
  Nenad Karanović (April 2022)
  Dušan Petrović (May 2022 – present)

Season-by-season

Notable players 
  Nenad Mišanović
  Miloš Šakota
  Nemanja Nenadić
  Miloš Vraneš

Trophies and awards
 Serbian Second League (2nd-tier)
 Runners-up (1): 2020–21
 First Regional League, Central Division (3rd-tier)
 Winners (1): 2019–20
 Runners-up (1): 2018–19

References

External links

 Team website
 Profile at srbijasport.net 
 Profile at eurobasket.com
 Profile at Belgrade Basketball Association

Slodes
Slodes
Basketball teams in Belgrade